This is a list of Iranian football transfers for the 2012–13 winter transfer window. Only moves featuring at least one Iran Pro League or Azadegan League club are listed.

Rules and regulations 
The Iranian Football Clubs who participate in 2012–13 Iran Pro League are allowed to have up to maximum 35 players (including up to maximum 4 non-Iranian players) in their player lists, which will be categorized in the following groups:
 Up to maximum 21 adult (over 23 years old) players
 Up to maximum 6 under-23 players (i.e. the player whose birth is after 19 July 1989).
 Up to maximum 5 under-21 players (i.e. the player whose birth is after 19 July 1991).
 Up to maximum 3 under-19 players (i.e. the player whose birth is after 19 July 1993).

Based on the fact that the League is started on 19 July 2012.

According to Iran Football Federation rules, each Football Club is allowed to take up to maximum 7 new player in the winter mid-season transfer time. These seven new players includes both Iranian and non-Iranian adult players whose ages are over 23 years old. In addition to these seven new players, the clubs are also able to take some new under-23, under 21, and under-19 years old players, if they have some free place in these categories in their player lists.

Iran Pro League

Aluminium Hormozgan 

In:

 

Out:

Damash Gilan 

In:

Out:

Esteghlal 

In:

  
  

Out:

Fajr Sepasi 

In:

Out:

Foolad 

In:

Out:

Gahar Zagros 

In:

Out:

Malavan 

In:

Out:

Mes Kerman 

In:

Out:

Naft Tehran 

In:

Out:

Paykan 

In:

Out:

Persepolis 

In:

Out:

Rah Ahan 

In:

Out:

Saba Qom 

In:

Out:

Saipa 

In:

Out:

Sanat Naft 

In:

Out:

Sepahan 

In:

Out:

Tractor Sazi 

In:

Out:

Zob Ahan 

In:

Out:

Azadegan League

Aboomoslem 

In:

Out:

Alvand Hamedan

In:

Out:

Esteghlal Ahvaz 

In:

Out:

Esteghlal Sanati 

In:

Out:

Etka 

In:

Out:

Foolad Yazd 

In:

Out:

Gol Gohar 

In:

Out:

Gostaresh Foolad 

In:

Out:

Gostaresh Foolad Sahand 

In:

Out:

Hafari Ahvaz 

In:

Out:

Iranjavan 

In:

Out:

Machine Sazi 

In:

Out:

Mes Rafsanjan 

In:

Out:

Mes Sarcheshmeh 

In:

Out:

Naft Masjed Soleyman 

In:

Out:

Nassaji 

In:

Out:

Nirooye Zamini 

In:

Out:

Parseh Tehran 

In:

Out:

PAS Hamadan 

In:

 
 

Out:

Saipa Shomal 

In:

Out:

Sang Ahan Bafq Yazd 

In:

Out:

Shahin Bushehr 

In:

Out:

Shahrdari Arak 

In:

Out:

Shahrdari Bandar Abbas 

In:

Out:

Shahrdari Tabriz 

In:

Out:

Shahrdari Yasuj 

In:

Out:

Shirin Faraz 

In:

Out:

Steel Azin 

In:

Out:

Notes and references

2012
Football transfers winter 2012–13
Transfers